Augusta Township is a township in Butler County, Kansas, United States.  As of the 2000 census, its population was 1,405.

History
Augusta Township was organized in 1870. It was named Augusta in honor of a postmaster's wife.

Geography
According to the USGS, it contains one cemetery, Calvary. It also contains a cemetery called Augusta Township Cemetery (Kuster).

The streams of Elm Creek and Whitewater River run through this township.

Transportation
Augusta Township contains three airports or landing strips: Augusta Airport, Augusta Municipal Airport and Sills Air Park.

Further reading

Notes

References
 USGS Geographic Names Information System (GNIS)

External links
 City-Data.com

Townships in Butler County, Kansas
Townships in Kansas